The Saxon Shore Way is a long-distance footpath in England. It starts at Gravesend, Kent, and traces the coast of South-East England as it was in Roman times as far as Hastings, East Sussex,  in total. This means that around Romney Marsh the route runs significantly inland from the modern coastline.

History
The line of the Roman fortification that the route traces includes ancient forts, modern towns, nature reserves and coastline: four Roman forts built in the fourth century lie along the route, at Reculver, Richborough, Dover and Lympne.

At Seasalter there is an internationally important area for geese, ducks, and waders. The diversity of scenery along the route includes the wide expanses of marshland bordering the Thames and Medway estuaries, the White cliffs of Dover, and panoramic views over Romney Marsh from the escarpment that marks the ancient coastline between Folkestone and Rye.

The Saxon Shore Way was originally opened in 1980, but has since been re-established, and in parts re-routed and extended. It follows the coastline of the South East as it was about 1500 years ago, long before the North Kent Marshes or the Romney Marsh came into existence, when the cliff lines to the north and south extended further into the sea and when the Wantsum Channel provided a thoroughfare for boats between the Isle of Thanet and mainland England. The Way takes its name, the Saxon Shore, from a line of fortifications built along the coastline as it was in the 3rd century AD, towards the end of the Roman period. In this time of crisis Saxon invaders came from the southern regions of modern Denmark and in response the Romans built a line of defensive forts along the coast to repel the newcomers.

The route

Gravesend to Faversham

Gravesend, Town Pier where it shares a start with the Wealdway; Higham and Cliffe Fort;
Cliffe; Hoo Peninsula; Strood; Upnor; Rochester, where it meets the Medway Valley Walk; Gillingham;
Lower Rainham and the Riverside Country Park; Upchurch; along the side of The Swale (past Sittingbourne) and the Oare Marshes bird reserve; Faversham.

Faversham
The Faversham area section is from Conyer Creek in the west alongside The Swale, passing through Harty Ferry; Oare; Faversham and on to north of Graveney in the east. The Saxon Shore Way traces the coast as it was in Roman times and follows the line of the Roman fortifications.

Faversham to Deal
Faversham; Graveney Marshes; Seasalter; Whitstable; Swalecliffe; Herne Bay; Reculver and the Regulbium Roman Fort where it turns inland, separating from the Thanet Coastal Path;
Marshside where it meets the Wantsum Walk; Upstreet;
Plucks Gutter meeting the River Stour and joins the Stour Valley Walk to the Roman Fort at Richborough and Sandwich, meeting the White Cliffs Country Trail; Deal

Deal to Dover

The most picturesque part of the walk is arguably, the clifftop stretch between Deal and Dover passing South Foreland, with a midway break in St Margaret's at Cliffe.

Dover to Rye
As the walk follows the old coast line it heads inland to Lympne, Aldington (still part of the Saxon Shore Parish) and Kenardington via Hamstreet woods nature reserve before heading for Rye.

Rye
The Saxon Shore Way links with the 1066 Country Walk at Rye, East Sussex.

Rye to Hastings

The walk leaves Rye, following the Royal Military Canal as far as Winchelsea and then on to Hastings.

See also
 Greensand Way
 South England flood of February 1287

References

Long-distance footpaths in England
Dover District
City of Canterbury
Gravesham
Folkestone and Hythe District
Borough of Swale
Thanet
Footpaths in Kent
Footpaths in East Sussex
 
Coastal paths in England
Kent coast